Sonja Leila Moussa (born March 2, 1986), better known as Sonja Kinski, is an American Egyptian model and actress. She is the daughter of actress Nastassja Kinski and producer Ibrahim Moussa, and a granddaughter of actor Klaus Kinski.

Early life
Kinski was born in Geneva in Switzerland on March 2, 1986, but lived in Rome with her parents and half-brother Aljosha (who her mother had with Vincent Spano) until the age of 6 years.

Her parents divorced in 1992. She then moved to Los Angeles, where her mother began to have a relationship with musician and producer Quincy Jones. It is the latter that she considers as her true father, who raised and advised her in life. Kinski also has a younger half-sister Kenya, born in 1993.
Sonja Kinski is of Egyptian, German, and Polish origin.

Career
With Nastassja Kinski being an international celebrity in the 1980s and 90s, women's magazines were very interested in her daughter Sonja.

At the age of 14, Kinski appeared on the cover of the German edition of the Marie Claire magazine of March 2000. Then in the 2000s, on the covers of Marie Claire (February 2001, Germany), Photo (June 2003, France), Evening Standard (June 2006, United Kingdom), Jalouse (October 2006, France). In addition to advertisements in the press, she is regularly invited to participate in photo shoots for promotional events.

Kinski is affiliated to the Model Management agency. Her film career began in 2008. In the same year, she modeled for the character Zoey in the video game Left 4 Dead developed and published by Valve.

Filmography

Cinema

Television 
 2010 : Pom Wonderful  by François Girard : Eve
 2012 : Longmire (TV series), season 1, episode 8 : Fiona Hines alias October
 2017 : Chance (TV series), season 2, episodes 1–9 : Clara Santiago

References

External links
 

1986 births
Living people
21st-century American actresses
Models from Geneva
American female models
American film actresses
American television actresses
American people of Egyptian descent
American people of German descent